Master Blaster were a German dance music group which consisted of members Sascha van Holt, Rico Bernasconi and Mike de Ville.

History 
Their most successful single, "Hypnotic Tango", samples the Italo disco hit by My Mine. In 2002, it reached the top 10 of the Media Control Charts, and was one of the most successful dance singles of the year; it also earned them an Echo nomination, and was a hit in Austria, France, Switzerland, and the UK.
The following year, they released the singles "Ballet Dancer" together with Turbo B of Snap!, and "How Old R U?", another hit. Their debut album, We Love Italo Disco contains songs which sample various Italo disco hits.

In 2006, the group released "Since You've Been Gone", a cover of the 1976 Russ Ballard song. The following year they released their second studio album Put Your Hands Up. The single "Walking in Memphis"/"Can Delight" reached the top of the ClubRotation dance charts for several weeks.

Discography

Albums

Singles

References

German dance music groups
Musical groups established in 2002